The shadow darner (Aeshna umbrosa) is a species of dragonfly in the family Aeshnidae. It is found in almost all of Canada and most states in the United States.

Identification 
The base is brownish black in color. Greenish crescent-shaped spots are found at the top of the thorax. The sides of the thorax are marked with two yellowish to yellowish-green diagonal stripes. Its abdomen is marked with bluish green spots. The male shadow darner has paddle-shaped anal appendages.

This naiad is long and slender, which is the typical shape of immature darners. It is mottled green and brown. The shadow darner has a vertically flattened cerci with a spike at the end, which is much brighter than the lance-tipped darner.

Distribution 
This dragonfly is found in most of the United States except the dry Southwest and in all of the provinces and territories of Canada.

Habitat and diet 
The shadow darner patrols along small marshy streams. It is often found feeding along woodland edges or even in deep shadow in full forest. Shadow darners can also be found near ditches, slow streams, and ponds. This darner has a long flight season of late April to November.

The shadow darner naiad feeds on a wide variety of aquatic insects, such as mosquito larvae, other aquatic fly larvae, mayfly larvae, and freshwater shrimp. They also feed on small fish and tadpoles. This adult will eat almost any soft-bodied flying insect, including mosquitoes, flies, butterflies, moths, mayflies, and stoneflies.

Ecology 
The naiad is an active predator and are able to swim by jet propulsion. They squirt water out from the ends of their abdomens. They will generally take several years to mature, and when the immature changes into a dragonfly, it does so at night. This behavior probably was evolved to avoid being eaten be daytime predators. The adult generally flies from late April to November, and does all of its hunting while on the wing. The shadow darner is able to regulate its body temperature which enables it to fly in temperatures too cold for most dragonflies. This dragonfly species in particular seems to be extremely cold tolerant. This dragonfly flies at dusk and in shaded areas, and it flies later into the fall than any species other than the yellow-legged meadowhawk (Sympetrum vicinum).

Reproduction 
Male shadow darners establish and defend territories along the shores of slow streams and ponds. After mating, females fly singly, without the male attached, to lay their eggs in the stems and leaves of aquatic plants.

Subspecies 
A. u. occidentalis
A. u. umbrosa

References 
Ordonates Frame
Shadow Darner - Aeshna umbrosa
Aeshna umbrosa (Shadow Darner)
Catalogue of Life : 2009 Annual Checklist : Search
 Kurt Mead. (2009) Dragonflies of the North Woods. Second edition. Duluth, MN:Kollath+Stensaas, p. 38-39.
 Dunkle, Sidney W. (2000) Dragonflies through Binoculars. New York: Oxford University Press. pp. 176. .

Aeshnidae
Odonata of North America
Insects described in 1908